"Out in the Street" is a song written and performed by Bruce Springsteen from the 1980 album The River. It was recorded at The Power Station in New York between March and May 1980, as one of the last songs recorded for the album. Originally, Springsteen was going to keep the song off the album because it was so idealistic.

While the album is noted for the juxtaposition of dark emotional songs ("The River", "Independence Day") and upbeat pop songs ("The Ties That Bind", "Hungry Heart"), "Out in the Street" is a mixture of both themes. Along with "The Ties That Bind" and "Two Hearts", "Out in the Street" is one of the key songs on The River about the need for community.  The lyrics are reminiscent of the girl/party theme, and also evoke empathy for the blue collar working class. However, there is a sense of freedom in the chorus when the protagonist of the song leaves work and walks "out in the street".

The song features an echoing piano line played by Roy Bittan and also features a saxophone solo from Clarence Clemons. The final coda features weaving vocals from Springsteen, Roy Bittan, and Steven Van Zandt.  For one line, Springsteen stops singing, leaving just Steven Van Zandt singing the "meet me out in the street" refrain and sounding like a plea to be met, altering the tone of the song for that moment from its otherwise assertiveness.

"Out in the Street" has become a live favorite for E Street Band concerts and was performed at length during the 1999–2000 Reunion Tour, as captured on the Live in New York City album and video. During The River Tour, the vocal weaving was performed similar to the record. However, with Steve Van Zandt's absence on the Born in the U.S.A. Tour, the vocal weaving was occupied by Patti Scialfa and Nils Lofgren with Roy Bittan no longer singing. By the Reunion Tour, the vocal weaving was split between Springsteen, Van Zandt, Scialfa, Lofgren, and Clarence Clemons. Springsteen also has the audience join in.

CBS soap opera Guiding Light had one of its character Brandon/Lujack Luvonaczek Spaulding played by actor Vincent Michael Irizarry cover the song with a video in which it aired on its serial in the spring of 1985 as part of a storyline.

Personnel
According to authors Philippe Margotin and Jean-Michel Guesdon:

Bruce Springsteen – vocals, guitars
Roy Bittan – piano
Clarence Clemons – saxophone, tambourine
Danny Federici – organ
Garry Tallent – bass
Steven Van Zandt – guitars, vocal harmonies
Max Weinberg – drums

References

External links
 Lyrics & Audio clips from Brucespringsteen.net

Bruce Springsteen songs
1980 songs
Songs written by Bruce Springsteen
Song recordings produced by Jon Landau
Song recordings produced by Bruce Springsteen
Song recordings produced by Steven Van Zandt
American new wave songs
American garage rock songs